Stephen Brennan is the name of:
Stephen W. Brennan (1893–1968), American judge
Steve Brennan (born 1951), English darts player
Steve Brennan (footballer, born 1958) (1958–2015), English footballer
Steve Brennan (American reporter) (c. 1952–2009), Irish-born American reporter, journalist, and editor of The Hollywood Reporter